The FIBA Asia Under-18 Championship 2008 is the 2008 edition of the FIBA Asia's youth championship for basketball. The games are held at Tehran, Iran

The top 3 teams qualified for the FIBA Under-19 World Championship 2009.

Qualification
According to the FIBA Asia rules, each zone had two places, and the hosts (Iran) and holders (China) were automatically qualified. The other four places are allocated to the zones according to performance in the 2006 FIBA Asia Under-18 Championship.

Draw

* Uzbekistan withdrew from the tournament; their replacements, Kyrgyzstan, withdrew too after the plane carrying their team crashed, killing half of their team.

Preliminary round

Group A

Group B

Group C

Group D

Quarterfinal round

Group I

 China forfeited the game against Syria after they walked out while leading 46–41 in the 3rd quarter.

Group II

Group III

Group IV

Classification 9th–14th

13th place

11th place

9th place

Classification 5th–8th

Semifinals

7th place

5th place

Final round

Semifinals

3rd place

Final

Final standing

Awards

External links
Official website
Fiba Asia

FIBA Asia Under-18 Championship
2008–09 in Asian basketball
2008–09 in Iranian basketball
International basketball competitions hosted by Iran
August 2008 sports events in Asia
September 2008 sports events in Asia